The Common Burying Ground and Island Cemetery are a pair of separate cemeteries on Farewell and Warner Street in Newport, Rhode Island. Together they contain over 5,000 graves, including a colonial-era slave cemetery and Jewish graves. The pair of cemeteries was added to the National Register of Historic Places as a single listing in 1974.

History

The Common Burial Ground was established in 1640 on land given to city of Newport by John Clarke. It features what is probably the largest number of colonial era headstones in a single cemetery, including the largest number of colonial African American headstones in the United States.  The predominantly African-American northern section of the cemetery is commonly referred to by local African-Americans as "God's Little Acre".

The Island Cemetery was established by the city in 1836, and transferred to the private Island Cemetery Corporation in 1848.  Many members of Newport's most prominent families have been buried there over the years.  Notable people buried there include Medal of Honor recipient Hazard Stevens, Commodore Oliver Hazard Perry, Commodore Matthew C. Perry and financier August Belmont.

Grave markers returned
In 2016, three gravestones were discovered which had been lost for years. One stone, found in Pennsylvania, was a 12 x 24 marker for a 1-year-old child. The others were 1835 stones for a Newport woman, which were found in a Newport yard during a renovation. The recovered stones were reset in the Common Burying Ground in 2016 by the Newport Historic Cemetery Advisory Commission.

In 2017, two more burial stones found in Pennsylvania, those of Violet and Duchess Quamino, were returned and restored. Duchess Quamino, a free Black woman formerly enslaved to William Ellery Channing, had been an active member of Newport's African community.

Notable burials

Prominent people buried in the Common Burial Ground
 John Linscom Boss Jr. – United States Representative.
 Christopher Champlin – First Grand Master of the Grand Lodge of Rhode Island.
 Christopher G. Champlin – United States Representative 1797–1801, United States Senator 1809–11.
 Michele Felice Cornè – Painter.
 John Cranston – Colonial Governor of Rhode Island.
 Samuel Cranston – Colonial Governor of Rhode Island.
 William Ellery – Signer of the Declaration of Independence and colonial Deputy Governor.
 James Franklin – Printer and brother of Benjamin Franklin.
 Ann Smith Franklin – Printer & publisher, wife/widow of James Franklin (1st woman U.S. newspaper editor)
 Ida Lewis (lighthouse keeper) – Heroine of the 19th Century.  Recipient of the Gold Lifesaving Medal.
 Henry Marchant – Delegate to the Continental Congress.
 Dutee J. Pearce – United States Representative.
 Peter Quire – African-American leader and founder of St. John's Episcopal Church in Newport.
 Duchess Quamino (1739–1804), a formerly enslaved woman, known as the "Pastry Queen of Rhode Island
 Asher Robbins – United States Senator 1825–39.
 Gilbert Stuart – Portrait artist. (cenotaph)
 William Greene Turner – Sculptor, perhaps best known for his statue of Oliver Hazard Perry in Newport.
 Frances (Latham) Vaughan – "The Mother of Governors," widow to colonial President Jeremy Clarke, and mother of colonial governor Walter Clarke.
 William Vernon – Colonial era merchant.
 Richard Ward – Colonial governor of Rhode Island.
 Samuel Ward – Delegate to Continental Congress and colonial Governor of Rhode Island.

Prominent people buried in the Island Cemetery
 Hugh D. Auchincloss – Naval officer, government official and stockbroker
 Janet Lee Bouvier Auchincloss Morris – Mother of Jacqueline Kennedy Onassis
 August Belmont – Chairman of the Democratic National Committee 1860 to 1872 and founder of the Belmont Stakes
 August Belmont Jr. – Developer of the IRT Subway in New York City and the Cape Cod Canal
 Perry Belmont – United States Representative and Army officer
 Sara Swan Whiting Belmont Rives – 1st wife of Oliver H.P. Belmont and 2nd wife George L. Rives
 Yeoman (F) 3rd Class Gladys Carr Bolhouse – U.S. Navy veteran of World War I and local historian.
 Gunner George F. Brady, USN – Medal of Honor recipient.
 Captain Kidder Breese, USN – Commander of the Naval Landing Party at the Second Battle of Fort Fisher.
 Brevet Brigadier General Henry Brewerton – Superintendent of West Point Military Academy.
 Melville Bull – United States Representative, 1895–1903
 George Henry Calvert – Writer and Mayor of Newport
 Rear Admiral Augustus Case – Career Navy officer
 William Cole Cozzens – Mayor of Newport and Governor of Rhode Island, 1863
 Henry Y. Cranston – United States Representative from Rhode Island and commander of the Artillery Company of Newport
 Robert B. Cranston – United States Representative from Rhode Island
 George T. Downing (1819–1903) – abolitionist, entrepreneur, restaurateur
 Lieutenant Thomas Eadie, USN – Medal of Honor recipient (buried in Island Cemetery Annex).
 William Channing Gibbs – Governor of Rhode Island, 1821–24
 George Washington Greene – Historian
 John N. A. Griswold – Merchant, industrialist and diplomat
 Richard Morris Hunt (1827–1895) – Noted architect of Gilded Age
 Charles Bird King (1785–1862) – Painter
 Clarence King (1842–1901) – Geologist
 George Gordon King – Congressman
 Lewis Cass Ledyard – Lawyer and Commodore of the New York Yacht Club
 Captain Christopher Raymond Perry – Privateer in the American Revolution and naval officer in the Quasi War
 Commodore Matthew C. Perry (1794–1858) – Commander of Black Ships Expedition to Japan in 1853
 Commodore Oliver Hazard Perry (1785–1819) – Hero of the Battle of Lake Erie in War of 1812
 Lieutenant Colonel John Hare Powel – Army officer, Mayor of Newport and commander of the Artillery Company of Newport
 George L. Rives – Assistant Secretary of State
 William Paine Sheffield Sr. – Congressman and United States Senator 1884–85
 William Paine Sheffield Jr. – Congressman
 Major General Thomas W. Sherman – Civil War general
 William Watts Sherman (1842–1912) – Socialite and treasurer of the Newport Casino
 Brevet Brigadier General Hazard Stevens – Medal of Honor recipient and son of Isaac Stevens
 Major General Isaac Ingalls Stevens – Civil War general who was killed in action at the Battle of Chantilly
 Frank K. Sturgis – President of the New York Stock Exchange
 Brevet Brigadier General George W. Tew – Civil War officer.  Lieutenant Colonel of 5th Rhode Island Heavy Artillery.  Commander of the Artillery Company of Newport
 Commodore Benjamin J. Totten – Career U.S. Navy officer
 Charles C. Van Zandt – Governor of Rhode Island 1877–80
 Major General Gouverneur K. Warren – Chief engineer of the Army of the Potomac at the Battle of Gettysburg – Commander of V Corps (1863–65)
 George Peabody Wetmore – Governor of Rhode Island and United States Senator
 Katherine Prescott Wormeley – Literary translator, founder of the United States Sanitary Commission during the Civil War

Images

Common Burial Ground

Island Cemetery

See also

 List of cemeteries in Rhode Island 
 Touro Cemetery, the old Jewish cemetery at Newport
 Coddington Cemetery, where six colonial Rhode Island governors are buried
 Clifton Burying Ground, where four colonial Rhode Island governors are buried
 National Register of Historic Places listings in Newport County, Rhode Island

References

External links
 Island Cemetery website
 Colonial Slave Cemetery information
 
 
 History of Newport County, Rhode Island," ed. Richard M. Bayles, NY, 1888 (description of common cemetery)

1640 establishments in Rhode Island
Cemeteries in Rhode Island
Cemeteries on the National Register of Historic Places in Rhode Island
Slavery in the United States
Buildings and structures in Newport, Rhode Island
Jewish cemeteries in Rhode Island
National Register of Historic Places in Newport, Rhode Island
Tourist attractions in Newport, Rhode Island
African-American cemeteries